Māngere Mountain is a volcanic cone in Māngere, Auckland. It was the site of a major pā (Māori fortified settlement) and many of the pā's earthworks are still visible. It has extensive panoramic views of Auckland from its location in the southeastern portion of the city's urban area. It is also known as Te Pane-o-Mataaho ("the head of Mataaho"), and Te Ara Pueru ("the Path of Dogskin Cloaks").

The volcano features two large craters. It has a wide crater with a lava dome near its centre, a feature shared by no other volcano in Auckland. It first erupted approximately 70,000 years ago.

The mountain is one of the largest and best preserved of Auckland's volcanic cones. Many archaeological features remain, including kumara pits, garden terraces, walled garden mounds and stone boundary walls.

Near the mountain to the southwest is Māngere Lagoon, filling another volcanic crater.

References

Volcanoes of Auckland: A Field Guide. Hayward, B.W.; Auckland University Press, 2019, 335 pp. .

External links

Mangere Mountain Education Centre
Historic Mangere Mountain, Department of Conservation
Mt Mangere, Geological Society of New Zealand
Photographs of Mangere Mountain held in Auckland Libraries' heritage collections.

Auckland volcanic field
Mang
Te Waiohua
Lookouts in Auckland
Māngere-Ōtāhuhu Local Board Area